Auspicia quaedam (1 May 1948) is an encyclical of Pope Pius XII  on worldwide public prayers to the Virgin Mary for World peace and the solution of the problem of Palestine.

Background
The war in Palestine affected the holy places and therefore the encyclical hopes for a settlement of the situation through a just peace and mutual concord. To support this requests, the Pope asks for a holy prayer crusade to the Most Blessed Virgin. He asks  for a consecration to be made in the various dioceses as well as in each of the parishes and families.

Although a terrible  war has ended,  peace has not arrived in  the minds and hearts of all men. The post-war  period is full of dangers for  the family of nations, dangers of threatening disasters. Because human means are unequal to the task, the Pontiff  appeals in prayer first of all to God; he exhorts all  throughout the world, to implore, together, in ardent prayer the Divine assistance.

He thanks the Virgin Mother of God  for having obtained, through her powerful intercession, the long desired termination of World War Two.

The encyclical argues, that prayer to the Blessed Virgin must be more than words, they must be based on virtues, reform and a revival of Christian conduct. For only from Christian virtues one can  hope to see the course of history take its proper, orderly direction.

The Pontiff is concerned about the Holy Places of Palestine, which have long been disturbed.

Consecration to the Immaculate Heart of Mary 
He desires, that supplications be poured forth to the Most Holy Virgin for this request: that the situation in Palestine may at long last be settled justly and thereby concord and peace be also happily established.  He  places great confidence in her   powerful patronage and asks for the month of May 1948 for a crusade of prayers especially of children to  the  Heavenly Mother  For a  just solution of disputes, and  a firm and free peace for the Church and for all nations Pope Pius XII  dedicates the human family to the immaculate heart of Mary and asks local dedication to be made as well.

References

External links
The encyclical Auspicia quaedam on the Vatican website

Pope Pius XII Mariology
Encyclicals of Pope Pius XII
May 1948 events
1948 in Christianity

1948 documents